Mullu Kurumba is a Southern Dravidian language closely related to Malayalam.

Geographical distribution
 
According to Ethnologue, approximately 25,000 Mullu Kurumba speakers are situated in the Sulthan Bathery and Vythiri tahsils in the Wayanad district of Kerala; and the remaining more than 1,000 are situated in Erumad and Cherangodu villages of the Gudalur Tahsil, Nilgiri District, Tamil Nadu.

References

Malayalam language